In mathematics, an ordered algebra is an algebra over the real numbers  with unit e together with an associated order such that e is positive (i.e. e ≥ 0), the product of any two positive elements is again positive, and when A is considered as a vector space over  then it is an Archimedean ordered vector space.

Properties 

Let A be an ordered algebra with unit e and let C* denote the cone in A* (the algebraic dual of A) of all positive linear forms on A. 
If f is a linear form on A such that f(e) = 1 and f generates an extreme ray of C* then f is a multiplicative homomorphism.

Results 

Stone's Algebra Theorem: Let A be an ordered algebra with unit e such that e is an order unit in A, let A* denote the algebraic dual of A, and let K be the -compact set of all multiplicative positive linear forms satisfying f(e) = 1. If in addition every positive sequence of type l1 in A is order summable then A together with the Minkowski functional pe  is isomorphic to the Banach algebra .

See also 

 Ordered vector space
 Riesz space

References

Sources 

  

Functional analysis